Warren Brian Kennedy is a South African horse racing jockey who was the 2019/20 and 2021/22 South African Champion Jockey.

He has won Group 1 races in South Africa and one in New Zealand.

Riding career

Kennedy attended the South African Jockey Academy in 1995 when he was 14 years old. He became a qualified rider in 2000. Kennedy won the National Apprentice title in his final year.

His first race win came on board Coded Missile for trainer Nic Claasen at Fairview on 15 May 1998. It was a chance ride as the trainer's stable jockey fell ill. The race was the Lady Pedant Stakes, and being a listed race, Kennedy received no apprentice claim.

His first Grade 1 victory came on board Gabor in the Thekwini Stakes at Hollywoodbets Greyville. Other Group 1 wins include the Summer Cup with Summer Pudding, the Hollywoodbets Gold Challenge with Rainbow Bridge, and the Allan Robertson Championship with Vernichey. He also rode Triple Tiara winner Summer Pudding to victory in the Grade 1 SA Fillies Classic, the Grade 2 Wilgerbosdrift Gauteng Fillies Guineas, and the Grade 1 Woolavington 2000. 

In 2022 Kennedy moved to New Zealand where he was engaged by Byerley Park founder and Director Daniel Nakhle and managed by former Gauteng-based jockey Donavan Mansour. Kennedy quickly achieved race day wins. On Boxing Day he rode Defibrillate to win the Group One Zabeel Classic

In January 2023 Kennedy rode Prowess to win the Karaka Million 3YO Classic for Roger James and Robert Wellwood.

Personal life

Warren is the son of former jockey Terrence Kennedy.

Kennedy is married to Barbara (née Badenhorst), with who he has one daughter.

References

South African jockeys
Living people
1980 births